was a Japanese animator, director and character designer.

Career 
After graduating from a vocational college in Osaka, he began to work at Kyoto Animation. His first work as a key animator was Inuyasha in 2003 (which was contracted from Sunrise Inc). In 2006, he took on his first ever animation director role in the 10th episode of 2006 edition of Haruhi Suzumiya, and also took on the role of chief animation director in the 2009 edition of the same series.

He took on his first lead character design role in the 2011 anime adaption of Nichijou. In 2012, he worked on the original character designs of Hyouka, which is based on the mystery novel of the same title written by Honobu Yonezawa. As the original work is a novel, the character designs needed to be done from scratch.

Death 
On 2 August 2019, it was confirmed that he died in the Kyoto Animation arson attack on 18 July 2019. He was aged 37.

Filmography 

 Inuyasha - Key animator
 Full Metal Panic! - Key animator
 AIR - Key animator
 FMP! The Second Raid - Key animator
 Haruhi Suzumiya (2006 release) - Animation director, key animator
 Kanon - Animation director, key animator
 Lucky Star - Animation director, key animator
 CLANNAD - Animation director, key animator
CLANNAD ～AFTER STORY～ - Animation director, key animator
 K-On! - Animation director, key animator
 Haruhi Suzumiya (2009 re-release) - Chief animation director, animation director, assistant animation director
 K-ON!! - Animation director, key animator
 Nichijou - Character designer, chief animation director, animation director
 Hyouka - Character designer and draft, chief animation director, animation director
 Love, Chunibyo & Other Delusions - Animation director
 Tamako Market - Animation director, key animator
 Free! - Character designer, chief animation director, animation director, key animator
 Beyond the Boundary - Assistant animation director
 Love, Chunibyo & Other Delusions -Heart Throb- - Animation Director, key animator
 Free！-Eternal Summer- - Character designer, chief animation director, animation director
 Amagi Brilliant Park - Animation director, assistant animation director
 Sound! Euphonium - Animation director
 Sound! Euphonium 2 - Animation director
 A Silent Voice - Character design
 Miss Kobayashi's Dragon Maid - Animation director
 Free！-Dive to the Future- - Character designer, chief animation director

References

External links

Deaths from fire in Japan
People from Hiroshima Prefecture
People murdered in Kyoto
Anime character designers
Japanese animators
1980s births
2019 deaths
Victims of the Kyoto Animation arson attack
Kyoto Animation people